Guillaume Daniel Delprat CBE (1 September 1856 – 15 March 1937) was a Dutch-Australian metallurgist, mining engineer, and businessman. He was a developer of the froth flotation process for separating minerals.

Delprat was born in Delft, the Netherlands, son of Major General Felix Albert Theodore Delprat (1812–1888), later minister of war, and his wife Elisabeth Francina, née van Santen Kolff.

Delprat attended a high school in Amsterdam and later became an apprentice engineer on the Tay Bridge in Scotland. He attended science classes in Newport-on-Tay and learned calculus from his father by post. On returning to the Netherlands, he is said to have acted as assistant to Johannes Diderik van der Waals, physics professor at the University of Amsterdam. From 1879 to 1882, Delprat worked in Spain at the Tharsis Sulphur and Copper Mines.

In 1898, chairman Edward Wigg of BHP invited Delprat to Australia to become Assistant General Manager of BHP. He moved there with his wife and children. On 1 April 1899, he was promoted to General Manager, a position he held until 1921. At BHP, he pioneered the froth flotation process for refining sulphide ore. Delprat foresaw the exhaustion of BHP's mine at Broken Hill, and pushed for moving the company's smelters to Port Pirie; also construction of the BHP Whyalla Tramway. He shifted BHP from silver and lead mining to zinc and sulphur production. These moves were the basis of BHP's later success.

Delprat also pushed construction of the BHP steelworks at Newcastle, New South Wales. The contract was signed on 24 September 1912 and the steelworks were opened by Governor-General Novar on 2 June 1915. For Delprat's visionary judgement in the project he was made a CBE.

In 1935 Delprat was the first recipient of the medal of the Australasian Institute of Mining & Metallurgy.

Family
G. D. Delprat  married Henrietta Maria Wilhelmina Sophia Jas (died 5 December 1937) in Holland on 4 September 1879. Their seven children included:
Dr. Lica Delprat (–1963) married Dr. Milo Sprod (1882 – 31 December 1934) on 11 April 1916
Francisca Adriana "Paquita" Delprat (1891–1974) married (later Sir) Douglas Mawson (1882–1958) on 31 March 1914
Carmen Paquita Delprat (–) married Petrus Ephrem "Pierre" Teppema (1863–1935). She was a noted violinist; studied under Hermann Heinicke, Siegfried Eberhardt and Alexander Petschnikoff

References

1856 births
1937 deaths
Australian businesspeople
Australian engineers
Dutch emigrants to Australia
Dutch engineers
Australian metallurgists
People from Delft
Commanders of the Order of the British Empire